(also written 2017 DB120) is a near-Earth object, meaning that it has an orbit which brings it into proximity with Earth. It is an Amor asteroid, meaning that its orbit does not cross Earth's orbit, but its perihelion is close to, but greater than, the aphelion of Earth. It was first observed on February 25, 2017, when the asteroid was less than 1 AU from Earth and had a solar elongation of 169°.

This asteroid is a lost asteroid. It has a short observation arc of 2.4 days and has not been seen since 2017, so it has an orbit that is only roughly calculated. Also, there are variations in the absolute magnitude cataloged by various organizations, leading to variations in the estimated size of the asteroid (Sentry list H 23.0 implies 86 m vs MPC H 22.3 implies 120 m). These variations are in addition to the uncertainty in the size estimate caused by the uncertainty in the albedo.

This asteroid is in both the Risk List of the European Space Agency (ESA) - Space Situational Awareness (SSA) and in the Sentry List of the Jet Propulsion Laboratory (JPL) – Center for Near Earth Object Studies (CNEOS). According to the Sentry List, of the possible close encounters with Earth in the foreseeable future, an encounter on 26 March 2061 has the highest Palermo Technical Impact Hazard Scale value.

According to the Near Earth Objects Dynamic Site (NEODyS), of the possible close encounters with Earth in the foreseeable future, an encounter on 25 April 2031 is the most likely. This encounter has a minimum possible distance of zero, meaning that an impact onto Earth is possible.

See also

References

External links 
 
 
 

Minor planet object articles (unnumbered)

Lost minor planets
Potential impact events caused by near-Earth objects
20170225